Premotsava is a 1999 Indian Kannada-language romantic drama film directed and written by Dinesh Babu. The film stars Vishnuvardhan along with Devayani (in her Kannada debut), Roja  and Tara in the prominent roles. The film was produced by Anitha Kumaraswamy and presented by H. D. Kumaraswamy for "Chennambika Films" banner. The film released on 22 October 1999 to generally positive reviews from critics.

Cast
 Vishnuvardhan as Bharath
 Devayani as Chandana
 Roja as Bhavana
 Tara as Shanti
 Ramakrishna as Krishna 
 Sumithra as Hospital Warden
 Chitra Shenoy as Sara
 Tharakesh Patel

Production
The film was earlier titled as Navodaya and had cast Bollywood actress Priya Gill for the lead role. However, she was replaced with Devayani, a Tamil actress making her debut in Kannada cinema.

Soundtrack
The music of the film was composed debutant Praveen Dutt.

References

1999 films
1990s Kannada-language films
1999 romantic drama films
Indian romantic drama films
Films directed by Dinesh Baboo